Bethel may refer to the following places in the U.S. state of Indiana:

 Bethel, Delaware County, Indiana
 Bethel, Wayne County, Indiana